Buckingham Collegiate Charter Academy, commonly referred to as BCCA, is a charter magnet school located in Vacaville, California. BCCA is California's 56th charter school and the 19th school in the Vacaville Unified School District.

Demographics

According to U.S. News & World Report, 45% of Buckingham's student body is "of color," with 15% of the student body coming from an economically disadvantaged household, determined by student eligibility for California's Reduced-price meal program.

References

External links
 

High schools in Solano County, California
Charter high schools in California
Buildings and structures in Vacaville, California
Magnet schools in California